Dayu is a county in the west of the prefecture-level city of Ganzhou, in the southwest of Jiangxi Province, bordering Guangdong Province to the south. It is known for The Capital of Tungsten.

Statistics
Total population is 280,000.

Administration
The county executive, legislature, judiciary are at Nan'an Town (Nanan), together with the CPC and PSB branches.

Dayu county is divided to 8 towns and 3 townships.
8 towns

3 townships
 Fujiang Township
 Hedong Township
 Neiliang Township

Climate

References

 
Ganzhou
County-level divisions of Jiangxi